Cornelius is an unincorporated community in Jackson County, Kentucky, United States.

Notes

Unincorporated communities in Jackson County, Kentucky
Unincorporated communities in Kentucky